Martin Kitiyo Toroitich (born 10 August 1983 in Kurongur) is a Ugandan long-distance runner who specializes in the half marathon.

His younger brother  Boniface Kiprop Toroitich is a successful Ugandan runner.

Achievements

Personal bests
3000 metres - 8:19.67 min (2002)
5000 metres - 13:34.84 min (2002)
10,000 metres - 28:08.32 min (2004)
Half marathon - 1:03:52 hrs (2002)

References

External links

1983 births
Living people
Ugandan male long-distance runners
World Athletics Championships athletes for Uganda
Ugandan mountain runners
20th-century Ugandan people
21st-century Ugandan people